The 2021–22 Arkansas Razorbacks women's basketball team represents the University of Arkansas during the 2021–22 NCAA Division I women's basketball season. The Razorbacks, led by fifth-year head coach Mike Neighbors, play their home games at Bud Walton Arena and compete as members of the Southeastern Conference (SEC).

Previous season
The Razorbacks finished the season 19–9 (9–6 SEC) to finish tied for fifth place in the conference. The Razorbacks were invited to the 2021 NCAA Division I women's basketball tournament where they lost to Wright State in the First Round.

Offseason

Departures

2021 recruiting class

Incoming transfer

Roster

Schedule

|-
!colspan=9 style=| Exhibition

|-
!colspan=9 style=| Non-conference regular season

|-
!colspan=9 style=| SEC regular season

|-
!colspan=9 style=| SEC Tournament

|-
!colspan=9 style=| NCAA tournament

See also
2021–22 Arkansas Razorbacks men's basketball team

References

Arkansas Razorbacks women's basketball seasons
Arkansas
Arkansas
Arkansas Razorbacks
Arkansas Razorbacks